Richard or Dick Bond may refer to:

 Richard Bond (architect) (1798–1861), American architect in Boston, Massachusetts
 Dicky Bond (1883–1955), English footballer
 Dick Bond (Washington politician) (1921–2015), American politician, member of the Washington House of Representatives
 Dick Bond (Kansas politician) (1935–2020), American politician, Kansas state senator
 Dick Bond (cricketer) (born 1948), English cricketer
 Dick Bond (astrophysicist) (born 1950), Canadian astrophysicist and cosmologist
 Richard L. Bond, American businessman, president and CEO of Tyson Foods
 Richard Bond (political executive), American political executive, chairman of the Republican National Committee

See also 
 Bond (surname)